Adam Sinagra (born January 10, 1995) is a former Canadian football quarterback for the Calgary Dinos of the Canada West conference of U Sports. He is a Vanier Cup champion after winning with the Dinos in 2019 and was named the game's MVP. He also won the Hec Crighton Trophy in 2018 as U Sports football's most outstanding player.

University career
Sinagra became the starting quarterback for the Dinos mid-way through the 2016 season and led the team to Hardy Cup conference championships in 2016, 2017, and 2019. In 2018, he won the Hec Crighton Trophy as the most valuable player in U Sports football after passing for a U Sports record 3,233 passing yards, completing 186 passes out of 281 attempts with 23 passing touchdowns and five interceptions. In 2019, he was the starting quarterback in the 55th Vanier Cup game, where he led the Dinos to a 27–13 victory over the Montreal Carabins and was named the game's Most Valuable Player.

Professional career
Sinagra was ranked as the 14th best player in the CFL's Amateur Scouting Bureau December rankings for players eligible in the 2020 CFL Draft, and sixth by players in U Sports, at the end of the 2019 U Sports season, but dropped off the CFL's final Top 20 list in April. He went undrafted in the 2020 CFL Draft. He was reportedly added as a non-counter player by the Montreal Alouettes, although it had not been officially announced.

References

External links
Calgary Dinos bio 

1995 births
Living people
Calgary Dinos football players
Canadian football quarterbacks
Players of Canadian football from Quebec
People from Pointe-Claire